Michael Doudoroff (1911–1975) was an American microbiologist. With Nathan Entner, he discovered the Entner–Doudoroff pathway. He was born in St. Petersburg, Russian Empire but moved to San Francisco when he was 12 years old. He entered Stanford University (1929) where he completed his PhD under the supervision of Cornelis Van Niel at the Hopkins Marine Station.

References

External links
National Academy of Sciences Biographical Memoir

1911 births
1975 deaths
Soviet emigrants to the United States
American microbiologists